Graham County Schools is a PK–12 graded school district serving Graham County, North Carolina, United States. Its three schools serve 1,252 students as of the 2010–11 school year.

History
From 2007 through 2009, the school district tried to establish random drug testing for teachers in the school system. The North Carolina Association of Educators filed a lawsuit to prevent the testing. A lower court upheld the district's policy, but an appeals court struck down the ruling. Other states and school districts had similar suits in the courts and were watching the court's ruling. The school system decided not to pursue any higher appeals or challenges.

Student demographics
For the 2010–11 school year, Graham County Schools had a total population of 1,252 students and 86.87 teachers on a (FTE) basis. This produced a student-teacher ratio of 14.41:1. That same year, out of the student total, the gender ratio was 52% male to 48% female. The demographic group makeup was: White, 84%; American Indian, 13%; Hispanic, 2%; Black, 0%; and Asian/Pacific Islander, 0% (two or more races: 1%). For the same school year, 63.81% of the students received free and reduced-cost lunches.

Governance
The primary governing body of Graham County Schools follows a council–manager government format with a five-member Board of Education appointing a superintendent to run the day-to-day operations of the system. The school system currently resides in the North Carolina State Board of Education's Eighth District.

Board of Education
The five members of the Board of Education meet on the first Tuesday of each month. The current members of the board are: Rodney Nelson (Chair), Chip Carringer (Vice-Chair), Lois Satterfield, Sharon Edwards, and Deborah Odom.

Superintendent
The current superintendent of the system is Angie Knight.

Member schools
Graham County Schools has three schools ranging from pre-kindergarten to twelfth grade: one high school, one middle school, and one elementary school. They are all located in Robbinsville, North Carolina.

 Robbinsville High School, grades 9–12
 Robbinsville Middle School, grades 7–8
 Robbinsville Elementary School, grades PK–6

See also
List of school districts in North Carolina

References

External links
 

Education in Graham County, North Carolina
School districts in North Carolina